The Lamar Ledger is a twice-weekly newspaper in Lamar, Colorado. The Lamar Ledger is published by Prairie Mountain Publishing, a division of Digital First Media.

References

 

Newspapers published in Colorado
Prowers County, Colorado
Digital First Media